Ashby is a suburb of Perth, the capital city of Western Australia  north of Perth's central business district. Its local government area is the City of Wanneroo.

The suburb came into being in the late 1990s as a subdivision of Wanneroo, and was named in 1997 after a local landowner, Mr E E Ashby, who owned land in the area in 1913.

Geography
Ashby is a triangular suburb and is bounded by Wanneroo Road to the southwest, Pinjar Road to the southeast and Conti Road to the north. About 40% of the suburb has been developed for residential purposes.

Transport 
Transperth bus route 467 operates through the centre of the suburb along Carosa Road, while route 468 operates along the western edge on Wanneroo Road.

References

Suburbs of Perth, Western Australia
Suburbs of the City of Wanneroo